The men's decathlon event at the 2019 African Games was held on 26 and 27 August in Rabat.

Medalists

Results

100 metres
Wind: +0.1 m/s

Long jump

Shot put

High jump

400 metres

110 metres hurdles
Wind: -0.3 m/s

Discus throw

Pole vault

Javelin throw

1500 metres

Final standings

References

Decathlon
African Games